Tatolo Mphuthing (born 16 May 1979) is a Mosotho footballer who currently plays as a midfielder for Roma Rovers. He has won eight caps for the Lesotho national football team since 2002.

External links

Association football midfielders
Lesotho footballers
Lesotho international footballers
1979 births
Living people